Pseudestola is a genus of longhorn beetles of the subfamily Lamiinae, containing the following species:

 Pseudestola ayri Galileo & Martins, 2012
 Pseudestola densepunctata Breuning, 1940
Pseudestola maculata Bezark & Santos-Silva, 2019

References

Desmiphorini